is a railway station in Konohana-ku, Osaka, Osaka Prefecture, Japan.

Lines 
Hanshin Electric Railway
Hanshin Namba Line

Layout

Adjacent stations 

|-
!colspan=5|Hanshin Railway
|-

All rapid express trains pass Chidoribashi, Dempo, Fuku, Dekijima, and Daimotsu every day from March 20, 2012, and suburban semi-express trains run to Amagasaki instead.

References 

Konohana-ku, Osaka
Railway stations in Osaka
Stations of Hanshin Electric Railway
Railway stations in Japan opened in 1924